Barbara Casini (born 1954 in Florence) is an Italian jazz vocalist and guitarist. 

While studying piano, she was exposed to bossa nova at the age of 15, which had a marked influence on her musical life. After graduating with a degree in psychology from the University of Padova, she started performing in 1979. 

She has recorded and performed with Lee Konitz, Phil Woods, Leo Walls, Francisco Petreni, Stefano Bollani, and Enrico Rava.

Discography
1997 – Todo o Amor
1999 – Outro Lado
2000 – Vento
2000 – Sozinha
2001 – Você e Eu
2002 – Outra Vez
2003 – Uma voz para Caetano
2004 – Anos Dourados
2004 – Uragano Elis
2005 – Luiza

2007 – Palavra Prima
2007 – Nordestina
2009 – Formidable
2011 – Barato Total
2012 – Agora Ta
2015 – Uma Mulher
2016 – Terras

References

External links
http://www.barbaracasini.it/ Homepage
https://www.discogs.com/artist/159222-Barbara-Casini

Living people
1954 births
Italian musicians
Label Bleu artists